Andreas Christodoulou (born 26 March 1997) is a Cypriot professional footballer who plays as a goalkeeper for Cypriot First Division club APOEL and the Cyprus national team.

Club career
Christodoulou is a product of the Olympiakos Nicosia academies. He made 18 appearances for Olympiakos Nicosia. On 30 August 2015 he moved to Omonoia. He made his first team debut on 5 November in a win over AEZ Zakakiou in relief of Constantinos Panagi. He is related to Sotiris Kaiafas. On 8 July 2017, he signed a contract renewal until the summer of 2020.

Club statistics

Honours
AEK Larnaca
 Cypriot Super Cup: 2018

References

External links

1997 births
Living people
Sportspeople from Nicosia
Cypriot footballers
Cypriot First Division players
AEK Larnaca FC players
AC Omonia players
Olympiakos Nicosia players
Association football goalkeepers